Szyjki Stare  is a settlement in the administrative district of Gmina Glinojeck, within Ciechanów County, Masovian Voivodeship, in east-central Poland.

References

Szyjki Stare